Chennaiyil Oru Naal 2 is a 2017 Indian Tamil-language thriller film written by Rajesh Kumar and directed by JPR. Despite its title, the film is not a sequel to the 2013 film Chennaiyil Oru Naal, although Sarath Kumar reprises his role, while Napoleon, Suhasini, Ramdoss, and Baby Sathanya play other supporting roles. The music was composed by Jakes Bejoy with cinematography by Vijay Deepak and editing by Gopi Krishna. The film released on 18 October 2017.

Synopsis 
The story revolves around two bad guys who struggle with forces of good and evil while exploring the psychological secret that people tend to bury deep within their minds. The film reveals dark secrets, which manifest into a series of attacks that seek to destroy

Cast 

R. Sarathkumar as Sundarapandian IPS
Napoleon as Prabakaran
Suhasini as Sister Lily
Ramdoss as Ranjith
Baby Sathanya as Smitha
DMJ Rajasimhan as Kumar
Unnikrishnan as Unni
Anjana Prem as Sandhya
Dinesh Karuna as George
Ajay as Sachin
Kaushik as Tarun
Anju as Swapna
Maria as Nisha
Ranjith as Sub Inspector
Krishnan as Nasser

Production 
The film is adapted from a novel written by crime writer Rajesh Kumar. Jakes Bejoy composed the music and Deepak was the cinematographer. Principal photography took over a 28-day time-span. The film honored special guests (called a pooja) on the 17th of April 2017 in Coimbatore.

Critical reception
Times of India wrote "Chennaiyil Oru Naal 2 is inspired from a novel by crime novelist Rajesh Kumar, and the pulpy elements of its source are all too evident in the film's plot. [..] But the writing never manages to bring all these elements into a satisfactory narrative. The dialogue is stilted and the characters are just functional with no real presence. The investigation part is also amateurish, with Pandian hardly shown as someone who is making actual deductions. The direction is also off, with the actors (including the veterans — Sarath Kumar, Suhasini and Napoleon) performing in an artificial manner, moving and talking slower than people do in real life." The Hindu wrote "Despite being a short film, it feels stretched, underwritten and sometimes meandering all over the place." Cinema Express wrote "Chennaiyil Oru Naal 2 is a crime thriller with enough sub-plots to make a few more films. It's a case of too much in too little time. As if this weren't enough, the climax reveals another sub-plot which is explained to be the reason for all the crimes. The film never seems in any real hurry too, and feels as slow as its lead character when in the slo-mo running sequences. [..] The story, an adaptation of a crime novel, could have been intriguing, had its essence not got lost in translation."

References

External links
 
 
 
 
 

2017 films
2017 crime thriller films
2010s mystery thriller films
2010s Tamil-language films
Indian crime thriller films
Indian mystery thriller films
Films set in Chennai
Films shot in Chennai
Indian sequel films
Films scored by Jakes Bejoy